This article shows the rosters of all participating teams at the 2015 European Games – Men's tournament in Azerbaijan.





The following is the Bulgarian roster in the 2015 European Games.

Head coach: Nikolay Jeliazkov

Head coach:  Lauri Hakala



The following is the German roster in the 2015 European Games.

Head coach: Vital Heynen



The following is the Polish roster in the 2015 European Games.

Head coach: Andrzej Kowal

The following is the Russian roster in the 2015 European Games.

Head coach: Sergey Shlyapnikov







References

External links
 

European Games
Men's
European Games volleyball squads